Madeline Hurlock (December 12, 1897  – April 4, 1989) was a silent film actress.

Biography
Madeline Hurlock was born on December 12, 1897 (some sources say 1899 or 1900), the daughter of John W. Hurlock, an engineer, and Sallie Hurlock. She was of English and Italian ancestry. Hurlock attended a finishing school in Philadelphia, after which she acted in a repertory theatre company there.

In New York, Hurlock acted and danced in musical comedies at the Century Roof Garden and made her Broadway debut in the ensemble cast of The Rose of China in 1919.

Hurlock appeared in many short comedies for Mack Sennett, debuting as one of the Sennett Bathing Beauties in 1923, and was one of the WAMPAS Baby Stars of 1925. She was a talented comedian, also known for her beauty. She appeared in over 50 short films, the first of which, Where's My Wandering Boy This Evening? was made in 1923, and the last, Pink Pajamas, in 1929. She featured in one of Laurel and Hardy's early films, Duck Soup.

Hurlock married three times:

 She married Army Sergeant John S. McGovern in Ellicott City, Maryland, on August 4, 1917. They divorced in 1924.
 Marc Connelly, married 1930, divorced 1935. Connelly won the Pulitzer Prize for his play The Green Pastures in 1930.
 Robert E. Sherwood, married 1935. Sherwood won the Pulitzer Prize four times; he died in 1955.

According to Myrna Loy's autobiography, Hurlock and Sherwood had a difficult time getting married. In Budapest she told Loy, "These suspicious old men kept saying, 'You have to be examined to see if you are... if you are... why are you getting married? Are you pregnant?'"

Selected filmography
The Luck o' the Foolish (1924)
The Cat's Meow (1924)
The Hansom Cabman (1925)
Butter Fingers (1925)
Don Juan's Three Nights (1926)
 Flirty Four-Flushers (1926)
Duck Soup (1927)

References

External links

American film actresses
American silent film actresses
Actresses from Maryland
1897 births
1989 deaths
20th-century American actresses
People from Caroline County, Maryland
20th-century American comedians
WAMPAS Baby Stars